Stone Creek is an unincorporated community in Lee County, Virginia, United States.

Stone Creek took its name from a creek noted for its rocky bed.

References

Unincorporated communities in Lee County, Virginia
Unincorporated communities in Virginia